Alvadore is an unincorporated community in Lane County, Oregon, United States, located nine miles northwest of downtown Eugene and one mile northeast of Fern Ridge Reservoir.

History
Alvadore was named for Alvadore Welch of Portland, who built the Portland, Eugene and Eastern Railway through the community. The railway was later acquired by the Southern Pacific Railroad, but in 1936 the track was torn up. Alvadore post office was established in 1914.

According to the U.S. Geological Survey's database of geographic names, Alvadore is the only locality so named in the United States.

At one time Alvadore had a school.

Climate
This region experiences warm (but not hot) and dry summers, with no average monthly temperatures above .  According to the Köppen Climate Classification system, Alvadore has a warm-summer Mediterranean climate, abbreviated "Csb" on climate maps.

References

External links
History of Alvadore from the Lane County Historical Society

Unincorporated communities in Lane County, Oregon
Unincorporated communities in Oregon